Catalogue of rotational velocities of the stars is the name for catalogue of projected stellar rotation, published in 1982 by Uesugi, A. and Fukuda, I.

Downloadable catalogs of the projected stellar rotation 
 Standard source - Uesugi&Fukuda catalog, published in 1982, 6472 objects
 Older source - Bernacca&Perinotto catalog published in 1973, 3099 objects
 Newer source - Glebocki&al. catalog published in 2000, 17490 objects

See also 
General Catalogue of Stellar Radial Velocities

Astronomical catalogues of stars